Hatsofe B'Erez Hachadosho (1871–1876) was the first Hebrew periodical in the United States.  It was compiled and published by Zev Hirsch Bernstein.  It contained Jewish and general current events of local, national and international interest, essays, poetry, history, biography, and rabbinics.

References

Hebrew-language mass media in the United States
Jewish magazines published in the United States
Magazines established in 1871
Magazines disestablished in 1876
Defunct magazines published in the United States